Trinity Christian High School is a private, Calvinist high school affiliated with the Protestant Reformed Churches in America in Hull, Iowa, United States, serving students in grades 9–12. It is one of two Calvinist secondary schools in the city. Western Christian High School is the other. Trinity Christian was founded in 2008, as a successor to Northwest Iowa Protestant Reformed School and secondary school for Hull Protestant Reformed Christian School. The school mascot, chosen in 2012, is the Tiger. The school joined the War Eagle Conference in 2013 and also attained Iowa Board of Education special accreditation that year. A one to one computing initiative began in 2014.

Athletics
The Tigers compete in the following sports in the War Eagle Conference:

Cross Country
Volleyball
Football
Basketball
Track and Field
Golf 
Baseball
Softball
Hunting Trophy Deer
Catching 10lb Bass

See also
List of high schools in Iowa

References

Christian schools in Iowa
Educational institutions established in 2008
Schools in Sioux County, Iowa
Private high schools in Iowa
Hull, Iowa
2008 establishments in Iowa